Emily Wright (born July 1, 1980) is an American songwriter, producer and engineer based in Los Angeles.

Early life 

Wright grew up in Wethersfield, Connecticut, graduating from Glastonbury High School and the Greater Hartford Academy of the Arts in 1998. Wright studied theater and directing at New York University and, upon graduation, worked in sound design in theater, working in New York, Chicago and Minneapolis, and then in television.

Music career 

After getting laid off from a job in television, Wright was introduced by a mutual friend to songwriter and producer Dr. Luke. Wright started her career by running errands for Gottwald before becoming an engineer, vocal producer and songwriter.

Wright's first official credit was as engineer on Lil Mama's VYP (Voice of the Young People). Since then, she has recorded and produced for numerous performers including Katy Perry, Britney Spears, Ke$ha, Miley Cyrus, Jessie J, Flo Rida, Kelly Clarkson, Cobra Starship, Taio Cruz, Adam Lambert and Karmin. Some of her notable tracks are Cyrus's "Party in the USA," Miranda Cosgrove's "Kissin U," Spears' "Circus," Clarkson's "My Life Would Suck Without You," & Perry's "I Kissed A Girl" and "Hot N Cold".

In 2010, Wright began work on Katy Perry's Teenage Dream as an engineer. The album would go on to earn four Grammy nominations, including Album of the Year and Best Pop Vocal Album. That same year, Wright recorded and vocal edited eight songs on Ke$ha's Animal. The following year, Wright engineered eight songs and co-wrote one song ("Gasoline") on Britney Spears' Femme Fatale.

In February 2012, Wright began working with musician Adam Young and Owl City. That same year, Wright wrote and co - produced "Brokenhearted" off Karmin's Hello EP. In 2016, Emily co-wrote "Call Me When You Get There" and "You Can Have Mine" off Dan Layus's solo album "Dangerous Things". In February 2019, Wright collaborated as a vocal producer with Sekai no Owari (End of the World) and Static & Ben El.

Discography

Personal life 

On August 23, 2015, Wright married Matt Thiessen, lead singer of band Relient K, in New York City. They divorced on February 23, 2018.

References 

1980 births
Living people
American audio engineers
People from Wethersfield, Connecticut
Tisch School of the Arts alumni
Musicians from Nashville, Tennessee